Derici is a Turkish surname. Notable people with the surname include:

 İpek Derici (born 1990), Turkish basketball player
 İrem Derici (born 1987), Turkish singer and songwriter
 Okan Derici (born 1993), Turkish footballer

Turkish-language surnames